is a sketch comedy television show, starring members of the girl group Nogizaka46 and comedy duo . It ran for two seasons on Nippon TV from 2020 to 2021, and a live comedy and concert show was held on live streaming as the final installment. The first season exclusively features Nogizaka46 members from the fourth generation, while the second season features the third generation as well.

The skits 
This is a non-exhaustive list of the skits performed in the show.

Production 
According to producer , the idea to create a sketch show for the Nogizaka46 fourth generation members came during production of the group's previous show Nogizaka, Doko e, in which they first appeared in a sketch segment. Several characters developed for Nogizaka Skits were based on the members' distinct personalities as displayed on that show. The Saraba Seishun no Hikari duo have also been the co-hosts of Nogizaka, Doko e and are experienced in sketch comedy, being regular finalists in the TBS Television sketch contest show .

Like Nogizaka, Doko e, the first season of Nogizaka Skits exclusively features Nogizaka46 members from the fourth generation, who joined the group in two batches in 2018 and 2020. The second season features the addition of the third generation members, who joined the group in 2016. The show aired for two seasons from 2020 to 2021, followed by a live sketch comedy show and concert titled Nogizaka Skits Live, held through live streaming as the final installment on April 18, 2021.

Reception 
Host and television personality Roland mentioned Rei Seimiya's parody of him on his Instagram account, commenting on her character's "inadequate" blond hair compared to his own.

Coconuts and Entame Next praised Shiori Kubo's performance as an "emotionally unstable" casino dealer, masterfully shifting between "cutesy" and "devilish" personalities.

References

External links 
  

Nogizaka46
Japanese variety television shows
2020 Japanese television series debuts
2021 Japanese television series endings
Television sketch shows
2020s television sketch shows
Nippon TV original programming